Greenland Medal for Meritorious Service, is awarded by the Greenland Home Rule government. It is the highest award based in Greenland. The medal was instituted on 1 May 1989 in connection with the ten-year anniversary of the Greenlandic home rule. The medal is awarded for meritorious service for Greenland in fields such as public service, business, art, or science. The medal is worn in a ribbon of the Greenlandic colours; red symbolising the sun and white symbolising the snow. The medal is awarded in two grades: gold and silver.

Notable recipients
Jonathan Motzfeldt gold
Margrethe II of Denmark gold
Poul Schlüter gold
Lars-Emil Johansen gold
Uffe Ellemann-Jensen gold
Henrik, Prince Consort of Denmark gold
Frederik, Crown Prince of Denmark gold
Per Stig Møller gold
Hans Enoksen gold
Prince Takamado of Japan gold
Eigil Knuth gold
Friis Arne Petersen gold
Ûssarĸak K'ujaukitsoĸ silver
Mary Simon, Governor General of Canada, gold

See also
 List of orders, decorations, and medals of the Kingdom of Denmark

References 

Orders, decorations, and medals of Greenland